WMOQ (92.3 FM) is a radio station broadcasting a classic country format licensed to Bostwick, Georgia, United States.  The station is currently owned by Bostwick Broadcasting Group, Inc. and features programming from ABC Radio .

References

External links

MOQ
Radio stations established in 1992